394th may refer to:

394th Bombardment Group, unit of the New York Air National Guard, stationed at Francis S. Gabreski Air National Guard Base
394th Combat Training Squadron, United States Air Force unit assigned to the 509th Operations Group
394th Fighter Squadron, inactive United States Air Force unit
394th Infantry Regiment (United States), established in 1918 and assigned to the 99th Division as a member of the National Army
394th Strategic Missile Squadron (394 SMS) was an intercontinental ballistic missile that operated the Minuteman and Titan II missile at Vandenberg AFB, California

See also
394 (number)
394, the year 394 (CCCXCIV) of the Julian calendar
394 BC